Citizen Steely Dan is a four-CD box set compilation album by Steely Dan, released in 1993. The set is a collection of all of Steely Dan's albums (up to 1980) in chronological order, and also contains a non-album single ("FM (No Static at All)"), a non-album B-side ("Bodhisattva (Live)"), a rare compilation track recorded during the sessions for The Royal Scam but released only on the 1978 Greatest Hits ("Here at the Western World"), and a previously unreleased demo of "Everyone's Gone to the Movies" (a song from their 1975 album Katy Lied).

The set is not a complete compilation of every track released by Steely Dan up to 1993. Missing are both sides of the band's 1972 debut single ("Dallas" b/w "Sail the Waterway"), neither of which has ever been re-issued on CD, because of the band's dislike of the songs. The compilation was the first release of the remastered versions of Steely Dan's albums until the remastered studio albums were issued in 1998.

The first pressing features "Rikki Don't Lose That Number" using the single edit of the song. This version omits the percussive opening for the song. The second pressing of the box set features the version from the album although it was reissued without any information noting the change.

Glenn Meadows remastered the CD set from the digital masters archived by Donald Fagen, Gary Katz and Roger Nichols in 1982. The digital tapes were prepared because the original analog tapes were in very poor shape. The earliest CD mastering for all the Steely Dan albums in 1985 used these digital tapes but MCA used deteriorating analog masters for all later CD pressings until the 1998 remasters. This information was revealed by Nichols in 1991 when asked about his opinion of the Mobile Fidelity Gold reissues of Aja and Gaucho. Nichols remarked that the "Gaucho CD was even a different speed, about a quarter tone sharper" when compared to the original CD that he was involved in.

Track listing

Personnel 

Wayne Andre – trombone
Jerome Aniton – speech/speaker/speaking part
Patti Austin – vocals (background)
Jeff Baxter – guitar, pedal steel, Spanish guitar
Walter Becker – bass, guitar, harmonica, trumpet, bass (electric), flugelhorn, keyboards, vocals
Joe Bellamy – assistant engineer
Ben Benay – guitar (acoustic)
Crusher Bennett – percussion
Randy Brecker – trumpet, flugelhorn
Ray Brown – bass (upright)
Hiram Bullock – guitar
Ed Caraeff – photography
Larry Carlton – guitar
Geary Chansley – research
Pete Christlieb – flute, saxophone
Gary Coleman – percussion
Ronnie Cuber – sax (baritone)
Rick Derringer – guitar, slide guitar
Denny Dias – guitar, sitar (electric)
Henry Diltz – photography
Donald Fagen – organ, synthesizer, piano, piano (electric), vocals, vocals (background)
Wilton Felder – bass
Victor Feldman – percussion, marimba, vibraphone
Michael Fennelly – vocals (background)
Venetta Fields – vocals (background)
Bob Findley – horn
Chuck Findley – arranger, horn, brass
Frank Floyd – vocals (background)
Steve Gadd – drums
Jerry Garszza – overdubs
Gordon Grady – vocals (background)
Diva Gray – vocals (background)
Jay Graydon – guitar
Ed Greene – drums
Tom Greto – assistant engineer
Paul Griffin – arranger, keyboards, piano (electric), vocals (background)
Don Grolnick – arranger, keyboards, clavinet
Lani Groves – vocals (background)
Patricia Hall – vocals (background)
Jimmie Haskell – arranger, orchestration
Jim Hodder – percussion, drums, vocals
Jim Horn – flute, saxophone
Paul Humphrey – drums
Slyde Hyde – horn, brass
Barbara Isaak – assistant engineer
Anthony Jackson – bass
Plas Johnson – flute, horn, saxophone
Royce Jones – percussion, vocals, vocals (background)
Walter Kane – clarinet (bass)
Howard Kaylan – vocals (background)
Jackie Kelso – flute, saxophone
Jim Keltner – percussion, drums
Randall Kennedy – photography
Steve Khan – guitar

Clydie King – vocals (background)
John Klemmer – horn
Ken Klinger – assistant engineer
Mark Knopfler – guitar
Rebecca Louis – vocals (background)
Johnny Mandel – arranger
George Marge – clarinet (bass)
Rick Marotta – drums
Nicky Marrero– timbales
Sherlie Mathews – vocals (background)
Myrna Matthews – vocals (background)
Lew McCreary – brass
Michael McDonald – keyboards, vocals, vocals (background)
Andy McKaie – coordination
Leslie Miller – vocals (background)
Jeff Mironov – guitar
Lanny Morgan – saxophone
Rob Mounsey – synthesizer, arranger
Roger Nichols – sound effects, engineer, overdubs, executive engineer
Michael Omartian – piano
David Palmer – vocals, vocals (background)
Ron Pangaliman – assistant engineer
Dean Parks – guitar
Barney Perkins – mixing
Bill Perkins – saxophone
Jeff Porcaro – drums
Bernard "Pretty" Purdie – drums
Ed Rack – assistant engineer
Chuck Rainey – bass
Elliott Randall – guitar
Pat Rebillot – piano (electric)
Jerome Richardson – sax (tenor)
Lee Ritenour – guitar
James Rolleston – vocals (background)
John Rotella – saxophone
Joe Sample – clarinet, piano (electric)
David Sanborn – sax (alto)
Zachary Sanders – vocals (background)
Elliot Scheiner – engineer
Timothy B. Schmit – vocals (background)
Al Schmitt – engineer
Bill Schnee – engineer
Tom Scott – clarinet, flute, arranger, conductor, sax (alto), sax (tenor), Lyricon
Wayne Shorter – flute, saxophone
Valerie Simpson – vocals (background)
Steely Dan – arranger
Casey Syszik – vocals (background)
Linda Tyler – assistant engineer
Vartan – creative director
Mark Volman – vocals (background)
Florence Warner – vocals (background)
Ernie Watts – saxophone
Tim Weston – assistant engineer
Toni Wine – vocals (background)
Snooky Young – flugelhorn

References

External links
Official Citizen Steely Dan Site
Complete lyrics

1993 compilation albums
Albums produced by Gary Katz
MCA Records compilation albums
Steely Dan compilation albums